Johnsonia was a scientific journal published by the Museum of Comparative Zoology at Harvard University from 1941 to 1975. It was established by William J. Clench who named it after Charles Willison Johnson, who had been one of the men who convinced Clench to pursue the study of molluscs. It was primarily focused on the study of molluscs in the Western Atlantic, containing book reviews, guides on where to find various molluscs, drawings of and descriptions of molluscs, and related items.

External links 

Malacology journals
Harvard University academic journals
Publications established in 1941
Publications disestablished in 1974
English-language journals
Academic journals published by museums
Magazines published in Boston
Defunct journals of the United States